Jatindra Charan Guha (13 March 1892 – 2 January 1972), popularly known by his ring name Gobar Guha , was an Indian wrestler and practitioner of Pehlwani. He was the first Asian to win the World Light Heavyweight Championship in the United States in 1921.

Early life 

Gobar came from a family of wrestlers. The Goho family had been known for pioneering, promoting and popularising the art of Pehlwani and physical culture in Bengal, for generations. His great-grandfather had set up an akhara at Masjidbari Street. His forebears included the legendary Ambu babu, and Khetu babu, who tutored Swami Vivekananda in the finer points of wrestling. His father Ram Charan too was well-versed in the art.

Gobar was born to Ram Charan in 1892 in Kolkata. He began his initial training under the guidance of his grandfather Ambika Charan Guha. He also took lessons from his uncle Khetra Charan Goho and father Ram Charan Goho. He began rigorous training under famous Indian wrestlers like Kholsa Chaubey and Rahmani Pehlwan, who were employed by the Goho family.

When Gobar reached adulthood he stood at six feet and one inch and weighed around 290 pounds. His expanded chest measured 48 inches. In the meanwhile he also passed the Entrance examination from Vidyasagar school in 1910. He also received training in Hindustani classical music from Kukuv Khan and used to attend the musical soirees of Narendranath Basu.

Career
Gobar embarked on a professional career in wrestling in 1910 at the age of eighteen. He debuted against Navrang Singh, the court wrestler of the Maharaja of Tripura, but he didn't take any money.

In 1910, the John Bull Society of London organised a world wrestling championship bout to which wrestlers from all over the world including Gobar Goho and junior Gama of India were invited. In his first tour of Europe, Gobar fought bouts in Italy, Switzerland and England. Gobar went on a second tour of Europe in 1912 and returned home in 1915. During the trip he met Jack Johnson, the first black world heavyweight boxing champion at the wrestling tournament in Paris.  Next he defeated Campbell, the highest-ranked wrestler of Scotland. His next bout was against Scottish strongman and wrestler Jimmy Esson of Aberdeen, who has been described by the great strongman and wrestler Georg Hackenschmidt as 'the Scotch Giant'. Esson was at the receiving end throughout the fight and in the end resorted to illegal boxing punches. Gobar remained undeterred and duly wrestled the 'giant' on to the ground.

After the War, Gobar went on a third tour of Europe and the United States from 1920 to 1926. During this tour, he fought the bout of his lifetime, when he disposed of the then World Light Heavyweight Champion and catch wrestler Ad Santel on 24 August 1921 at the Coliseum in San Francisco. He became the first Asian to win a World Professional Wrestling Championship in the United States.

In his next bout he was pitted against the famous Ed 'Strangler' Lewis, considered by many to be the greatest ever professional wrestler. Lewis first tried his famous headlock on Gobar but to little effect. After a few rounds, Lewis managed to floor Gobar once, but the latter soon returned the compliment. Both fighters had registered two falls each, when Lewis resorted to foul play by hitting Gobar with a boxer's punch. When the referee overlooked this offence, Gobar turned to the judges to remonstrate, but at this moment, Lewis floored Gobar with a resounding thump, causing him to hit his head on the boards and lose consciousness.

In 1929, Gobar fought another memorable fight against the younger Gama at Park Circus, Kolkata in a bout that has since passed into the folklore of Indian wrestling. After a stirring fight which showcased all the moves of Indian wrestling, the older Gobar finally lost on a technicality. The akhara that was established by his ancestors at Masjidbari Street was reincarnated by Gobar Goho at Goabagan in 1936. Gobar Goho retired from professional wrestling in 1944.

Legacy 
Gobar Goho developed his own style of wrestling which took Indian wrestling into newer heights. His achievements and success inspired Bengali Hindus to take up wrestling as a career which was seen as the traditional bastion of muslims.

Not only wrestlers but the famous body builders like Manohar Aich and Monotosh Roy were inspired by his successes. His own disciples included his son Manik and his students Banamali Ghosh, Jyotish Charan Ghosh and Biswanath Dutta. His followers observed his birth centenary in 1992.

Goabagan Street in North Kolkata has been named Gobar Goho Sarani in his honour. His statue was installed and unveiled at the Azad Hind Bagh in 1996 by the then Governor of West Bengal, Late Raghunath Reddy. On the current day his akhara Gobar Goho's Gymnasium runs firmly at 19/D/H/7, Gobar Goho Sarani, Kolkata-700006. The nearest prominent landmark is the Scottish Church College.

Notes

External links 
 Abridged wrestling events History. 
A copy of the original "The Japanese Pro-Wrestling / Reality Based Martial Art Connection" article by Sam Chan

Sport wrestlers from Kolkata
Indian male martial artists
1972 deaths
1892 births
Indian male professional wrestlers
Bengali people